The 2018 Western Athletic Conference men's soccer season is the 23rd consecutive competition of men's college soccer in the Western Athletic Conference under the 2018 NCAA Division I men's soccer season. The season will feature twelve teams, where five are affiliate members of the conference. Air Force, San Jose State, and UNLV will compete from the Mountain West Conference, while Houston Baptist and Incarnate Word come from the Southland Conference. Colleges in the WAC will begin competition on August 24, 2018, and conclude on November 9, 2018 after the 2018 NCAA Division I Men's Soccer Championship. Prior to the NCAA Division I Tournament Championship, there will be a postseason conference tournament held in Seattle, Washington at the Championship Field, where the winner is guaranteed to represent the WAC in the NCAA Division I Tournament. The California Baptist Lancers are ineligible for postseason as they are in transition to the NCAA Division I level. Chicago State and New Mexico State have defunct programs in this season.

Preseason

Award watch lists

Listed in the order that they were released

Media poll

Team

Individual

Rankings

Matches

 Note: Results updated after the last game of each day in WAC competition, and games are added/updated weekly after each rankings release
 Rankings are from the United Soccer Coaches Poll

Non–conference

Records against other conferences

 Note: Conferences eligible for the 2018 NCAA Division I Men's Soccer Championship only

References

 
2018 NCAA Division I men's soccer season